Ranuva Veeran is a 1981 Indian Tamil-language action film directed by S. P. Muthuraman, starring Rajinikanth, Sridevi and Chiranjeevi. It was released on 27 October 1981 on the occasion of Diwali. The film was later dubbed in Hindi as Zulm Ki Zanjeer. Despite starring two popular heroes from Tamil and Telugu cinema, Ranuva Veeran became a box office failure.

Plot 

The film opens with Chiranjeevi's character being chased and caught by a group of policemen, but he escapes. Meanwhile, a young soldier Raghu returns to his village, which is known for frequent thefts and murders perpetrated by the mysterious "One-Eyed Man" Chiranjeevi and his gang of thieves. Raghu soon meets Chiranjeevi; the two were once college roommates, but they had since separated. In addition to Chiranjeevi, Raghu reunites with his father, an Orthodox Iyengar who always condemns him, and he finds out that his sister eloped with a man few years before, which he later finds out was other than the gang leader of the thieves himself, Chiranjeevi. In the end, Chiranjeevi gets shot by his own son.

Cast 

Rajinikanth as Raghu
Chiranjeevi
Sridevi as Raghu's love interest
Poornam Viswanathan as Raghu's father
Nalini as Mythili
Seema as Raghu's Mother
J. Lalitha as Raghu's sister
K. Natraj
Mafia Sasi
G. Srinivasan
MLA Thangaraj
Parthiban in an uncredited role
 Thengai Srinivasan

Production 
Producer R. M. Veerappan wrote this script keeping M. G. Ramachandran in mind but since he was involved with politics, Rajinikanth was chosen instead. Chiranjeevi, who went on to become a popular actor in Telugu cinema acted in a negative role.

Soundtrack 
Soundtrack was composed by M. S. Viswanathan and lyrics were written by Pulamaipithan.

Release and reception 
Ranuva Veeran was released on 27 October 1981 on the occasion of Diwali, along with six other movies, including Andha 7 Naatkal, Keezh Vaanam Sivakkum, Thanneer Thanneer and Tik Tik Tik, it became a failure at box-office. Nalini Sastry of Kalki praised Babu's cinematography as main highlight while praising Sridevi's performance but felt Chiranjeevi and Thengai Srinivasan were underutilised. She concluded the film was entertaining till interval then it became boring.

References

External links 

1980s Tamil-language films
1981 action films
1981 films
Films directed by S. P. Muthuraman
Films scored by M. S. Viswanathan
Indian action films
Indian Army in films